The Udaloy class, Soviet designation Project 1155 Fregat and Russian designation Project 11551 Fregat-M ('Fregat' meaning Frigate), are series of anti-submarine guided-missile destroyers built for the Soviet Navy, seven of which are currently in service with the Russian Navy. Twelve ships were built between 1980 and 1991, while the thirteenth ship built to a modified design, known as Udaloy II class, followed in 1999. They complement the Sovremenny-class destroyers in anti-aircraft and anti-surface warfare operations. The codename Udaloy comes from an archaic Russian adjective удалой, meaning daring or bold.

History
The Project 1155 dates to the 1970s when it was concluded that it was too costly to build large-displacement, multi-role combatants. The concept of a specialized surface ship was developed by Soviet designers. Two different types of warships were laid down, which were designed by the Severnoye Design Bureau: Project 956 destroyer and Project 1155 large anti-submarine ship. The Udaloy class are generally considered the Soviet equivalent of the American s. There are variations in SAM and air search radar among units of the class.

In 2015, the Russian Navy initially announced that five out of the eight Project 1155 ships will be refurbished and upgraded as part of the Navy modernization program by 2022. In 2020 it was suggested that a total of eight Project 1155/1155.1 vessels would be upgraded to the same standard, though work on the remaining three units would extend beyond 2022. In addition to overhauling their radio-electronic warfare and life support systems, they will receive modern missile complexes to fire P-800 Oniks and Kalibr cruise missiles. The ships are to have their service life extended by 30 years until sufficient numbers of s are commissioned. Upgrades will include replacing the Rastrub-B missiles with 3S24 angling launchers fitted with four containers using the 3M24 anti-ship missile, and two 3S14-1155 universal VLS with 16 cells for Kalibr land attack, anti-ship, and anti-submarine cruise missiles in place of one of the AK-100 guns.

Udaloy II
Following Udaloys commissioning, designers began developing an upgrade package in 1982 to provide more balanced capabilities with a greater emphasis on anti-shipping. The Project 1155.1 Fregat II Class Large ASW Ship (NATO Codename Udaloy II) is roughly the counterpart of the Improved Spruance class; only one was originally completed.

Similar to Udaloy externally, it was a new configuration replacing the SS-N-14 with P-270 Moskit (NATO reporting designation SS-N-22 "Sunburn") anti-ship missiles, a twin 130 mm gun, UDAV-1 anti-torpedo rockets, and gun/SAM CIWS systems. A standoff ASW capability is retained by firing RPK-2 Vyuga (NATO reporting designation 'SS-N-15 Starfish') missiles from the torpedo tubes.

Powered by a modern gas turbine engine, the Udaloy II is equipped with more capable sonars, an integrated air defense fire control system, and a number of digital electronic systems based on state-of-the-art circuitry. The torpedo approaching warning function of the Polinom sonar system is retained and further improved by its successor.

Operational history
In 2008,  became the first Russian warship to transit the Panama Canal since World War II.

 deployed to the Mediterranean Sea from its home base in Russia's Northern Fleet in June 2014.

Ships

Gallery

See also
List of ships of Russia by project number
List of naval ship classes in service

References

External links

 Maritimequest Russian Destroyer Index
 Udaloy I class (Project 1155R Fregat) anti-submarine destroyer
 Project 1155/11551 - Complete Ship List

 
Destroyer classes